Tarsotinthia is a genus of moths in the family Sesiidae.

Species
Tarsotinthia albogastra Arita & Gorbunov 2003

References

Sesiidae